Vladimir Alexandrovich Berezin (born 3 April 1957, Oryol) is a Soviet and Russian actor, journalist, television and radio presenter. He was awarded the title People's Artist of Russia.

Biography
Vladimir Berezin was born on 3 April 1957 in Oryol. He studied at the Orel School of Culture at the Faculty of Directing, and later at the Faculty of Journalism at Ural State University.

Already by 1980, Berezin headed the newsroom on the Sverdlovsk's TV. He stayed in this place for 10 years. It happened almost by accident   even on local television Berezin noticed Boris Yeltsin, who invited him to his place in Sverdlovsk.

In the early 1990s, Berezin worked on Soviet Central Television. He was the leader of Good Morning, Good Night, Little Ones! and Vremya. Multiple announcer of the festival Slavianski Bazaar in Vitebsk.

References

External links
  Владимир Березин: Моё появление вызывает у людей приятные чувства
 Владимир Березин:  Горжусь тем, что я вайнах

1957 births
Living people
People from Oryol
Soviet television presenters
Russian television presenters
Soviet journalists
Russian journalists
20th-century Russian journalists
21st-century Russian journalists
Russian male actors
Russian radio personalities
People's Artists of Russia
Ural State University alumni